The 1930 Maryland gubernatorial election was held on November 4, 1930. Incumbent Democrat Albert Ritchie defeated Republican nominee William Frederick Broening with 55.96% of the vote.

General election

Candidates
Major party candidates
Albert Ritchie, Democratic
William Frederick Broening, Republican 

Other candidates
Elisabeth Gilman, Socialist
Robert W. Stevens, Independent
Samuel Parker, Communist

Results

References

1930
Maryland
Gubernatorial